Simplemente María (English: Simply María) is a Mexican telenovela produced by Ignacio Sada for Televisa. Based on an original story by the Argentine writer Celia Alcántara. It is a remake of the Mexican telenovela Simplemente María, produced in 1989. The series stars Claudia Álvarez as María, José Ron as Alejandro and Ferdinando Valencia as Cristóbal. The series originally aired from November 9, 2015, to May 1, 2016.

Episodes

References

Lists of Mexican television series episodes